Bad Schwartau is the largest city in the district of Ostholstein, in Schleswig-Holstein, Germany. It is situated on the river Trave and the Schwartau creek, approx. 5 km north of Lübeck. Bad Schwartau is a spa, well known for its iodide saline waters about 13 km from the Baltic Sea.

Notable people

Sons and daughters of the town 

 Wolfram Kühn (born 1952), former Vice Admiral of the German Navy and deputy Inspector General of the Bundeswehr
 Gerd-Volker Schock (born 1950), football player and coach
 Karl Schultz (born 1937), equestrian, Olympian in eventing 1972 and 1976

Personalities who live or lived in Bad Schwartau 

 Emanuel Geibel (1815–1884), German poet and playwright
 Erich Rudorffer (1917–2016), German Luftwaffe fighter ace
 Sandra Völker (born 1974), swimmer, freestyle and backstroke

References

Towns in Schleswig-Holstein
Ostholstein
Spa towns in Germany